Seth Senyo Agidi (1955 - 2020) was the Moderator of the General Assembly of the Evangelical Presbyterian Church, Ghana (E.P. Church) until his death in October 2020.

Education
Agidi trained as a teacher. He later attended the Trinity Theological Seminary, Legon which is affiliated to the University of Ghana. He also pursued postgraduate studies at the Eden Theological Seminary, United States of America.

Christian ministry
Agidi was once the district Pastor at Peki in the Volta Region, Sekondi-Takoradi. He also served in the same capacity in various districts in the Western Region, Ghana. He was also the principal of the E.P. Theological Seminary at Peki.

Prior to his appointment as moderator of the General Assembly, he was serving on various boards such as the E.P. University Council, E. P. Theological Seminary. He was also a member of the International Missionary Organisations. He was also the founder and president of Shepherd Centre of the Aged, a non-governmental organisation affiliated to the church. His last position before becoming the Moderator was Director of Programmes, Ecumenical and Social Relations of the Evangelical Presbyterian Church, Ghana. Agidi served in this role until his death in October 2020.

Personal life
Agidi was married with four children.

Death
Agidi was admitted to the Ho Teaching Hospital following a short illness and died on 10 October 2020. The day before his death, he had spoken at a press conference where he had spoken against the activities of the Western Togoland Movement, a separatist movement in the Volta Region of Ghana.

See also
Evangelical Presbyterian Church, Ghana

References 

2020 deaths
Ghanaian clergy
Ghanaian Presbyterians
Ghanaian theologians
Ghanaian religious leaders
Place of birth missing
Ewe people
Trinity Theological Seminary, Legon alumni
University of Ghana alumni
1955 births